"You Showed Me" is a song written by Gene Clark and Jim McGuinn (later known as Roger) of the Byrds in 1964.  It was recorded by the Turtles and released as a single at the end of 1968, becoming the group's last big hit in the U.S.  The song has also been covered or partially incorporated into other songs by a number of other acts over the years, including the Lightning Seeds, Salt-N-Pepa, and Lutricia McNeal.

The Byrds version
The song was composed by Clark and McGuinn in early 1964 at a time when the pair were performing as a duo at The Troubadour and other folk clubs in and around Los Angeles.  Critic Matthew Greenwald has described "You Showed Me" as "a minor-key romantic ballad", while also commenting that "the song has a near-Beach Boys feel and ends up being an effervescent piece of moody pop." Music historian Richie Unterberger has remarked that "You Showed Me", like many of the songs that Clark had a hand in writing during the 1960s, contains a mix of major and minor chords arranged in unexpected progressions. He also stated that the song recounts the tale of a lover who is being tutored in the ways of love by a more experienced partner.

Soon after writing "You Showed Me", Clark and McGuinn formed a trio with David Crosby and named themselves the Jet Set.  The trio began rehearsing at World Pacific Studios under the guidance of their manager Jim Dickson, with Michael Clarke and Chris Hillman joining the group soon afterward.  Dickson recorded many of the Jet Set's rehearsal sessions at World Pacific and it was during this time that demos of "You Showed Me" were recorded by the band.  The song was soon abandoned by the group, who had now changed their name to the Byrds, and was not included on their debut album, Mr. Tambourine Man.  However, recordings of "You Showed Me" by the Byrds, dating from 1964, were released on the archival albums Preflyte, In the Beginning, The Prefylte Sessions, and Preflyte Plus.

The Turtles version

In 1968, the song was recorded by the Turtles as part of their album The Turtles Present the Battle of the Bands. It was also released as a single in 1968, reaching  6 on the Billboard Hot 100.

"You Showed Me" had been introduced to the Turtles by their producer and former bass player, Chip Douglas, who had first become acquainted with the song after hearing Clark, McGuinn, and Crosby perform it at The Troubadour in 1964.  Douglas had also performed the song with Clark during 1966, while he was a member of Gene Clark and the Group. Although the song had originally been an uptempo number, Douglas first demonstrated it for the Turtles' vocalists Howard Kaylan and Mark Volman on a harmonium with a broken bellows, requiring him to play the song slowly.  The slower tempo impressed Kaylan and Volman and consequently, the Turtles' recording of the song uses this slower arrangement. Their version features an accompaniment of strings, including violins, violas, and cellos.

Charts

Weekly charts

Year-end charts

Salt-N-Pepa version

American rap trio Salt-N-Pepa incorporated parts of the song into their version, also called "You Showed Me", on their 1990 album, Blacks' Magic. It was released as the sixth and final single from that album. This single charted on the US Hot 100 and also reached No. 15 on the UK Singles Chart when it was released as a single in 1991.

Track listing
 You Showed Me (The Born Again mix) – 3:25
 You Showed Me (The Born Again club mix) – 5:41
 Let's Talk About Sex (Universal club) – 7:16

Charts

Weekly charts

Year-end charts

The Lightning Seeds version

In 1996, the song was covered in a trip hop style by British alternative rock band the Lightning Seeds and released as a single. It was originally intended to be a B-side to their previous single, "What If...", and utilises loops and samplers from the Turtles original. The song became the Lightning Seeds' most successful chart release (not including the two versions of "Three Lions") reaching No. 8 in the UK. By the time the single was released, drummer Chris Sharrock had left the band to join Robbie Williams' backing group, and new percussionist Zak Starkey took his place in its music video. Additionally, it peaked at No. 4 in Iceland and No. 42 on the Eurochart Hot 100. It was also included on the Austin Powers: International Man of Mystery soundtrack.

Critical reception
Dave Sholin from the Gavin Report wrote, "One of the Turtles' biggest hits comes out of its shell to be artfully re-invented by the Lightning Seeds. A gigantic hit in 1969, it plays well in Mike Myers' newest comedy, Austin Powers: International Man of Mystery. The film, like the song, doesn't disappoint." A reviewer from Music Week rated it four out of five, adding, "Remixed and reshaped from the version included on Dizzy Heights, it's a moody, atmospheric offering." David Sinclair from The Times viewed it as a "workmanlike version of the song written by Gene Clark and James McGuinn of the Byrds, complete with strings and "scratches"."

Music video
The accompanying black-and-white music video for "You Showed Me" was directed by Pedro Romhanyi.

Track listing

Charts

Sampling and controversy
The Turtles version also features a gently rising and falling string section, which was sampled by U2 in 1997 for their song "The Playboy Mansion" on their album Pop. Madison Beer's song "Showed Me (How I Fell in Love with You)" also sampled the Turtles' recording.

The American hip hop group De La Soul also sampled the Turtles' recording of "You Showed Me" for their song "Transmitting Live From Mars (Interlude)" on their 1989 album, 3 Feet High and Rising, but did not ask permission or clear the sample.  The Turtles took litigation against the group, suing them for $1.7 million.  An out-of-court settlement was reached for an undisclosed sum. It is said to be the first time that a hip hop act was ever sued for unethical use of another artist's music.

Other cover versions
The song has also been covered by Lutricia McNeal on her 2002 album, Metroplex.  In addition, Kanye West based his song Gorgeous, from his 2010 album My Beautiful Dark Twisted Fantasy, on elements derived from "You Showed Me". In 2011, the alternative country duo the Watson Twins offered a free download of their cover of "You Showed Me" on their website.

References

1968 singles
The Byrds songs
The Turtles songs
The Lightning Seeds songs
Salt-N-Pepa songs
Songs written by Roger McGuinn
Songs written by Gene Clark
1964 songs
RPM Top Singles number-one singles
Sampling controversies
Music videos directed by Pedro Romhanyi
Black-and-white music videos